Serhii Anatoliyovych Priadun (born October 11, 1974 in Kharkiv Oblast, Ukrainian SSR) is a retired amateur Ukrainian freestyle wrestler, who competed in the men's super heavyweight category. He won three medals (two silver and one bronze) at the European Championships, scored a fourth-place finish in the 120-kg division at the 2003 World Wrestling Championships in New York City, New York, United States, and also represented his nation Ukraine at the 2004 Summer Olympics. Throughout his sporting career, Priadun trained full-time for Tavira Wrestling Club in Simferopol, under his personal coach Vitali Karassov.

Priadun qualified for the Ukrainian squad, as a 30-year-old, in the men's 120 kg class at the 2004 Summer Olympics in Athens. Earlier in the process, he placed fourth and guaranteed a spot on Ukraine's wrestling team from the World Championships, losing to Iran's Alireza Rezaei for the bronze medal. Priadun lost two straight matches each to 2000 Olympic bronze medalist Alexis Rodríguez of Cuba (0–8) and Nestoras Batzelas of Greece (0–5) without obtaining a single point, leaving him on the bottom of the prelim pool and placing last out of 20 wrestlers in the final standings.

References

External links
 

1974 births
Living people
Olympic wrestlers of Ukraine
Wrestlers at the 2004 Summer Olympics
Ukrainian male sport wrestlers
European Wrestling Championships medalists
Sportspeople from Kharkiv Oblast